O Terceiro Travesseiro is a Brazilian fiction feature film based on Nelson Luiz de Carvalho's popular novel of the same name. It was produced by Letícia Segabinazi Dumas da Silva with a screenplay by Daniel Moreno Sant'Anna. This film focuses on the development of the relationship between teenage boy Marcus and his best friend Renato.

Plot
During the adolescence, two teenage friends find themselves in love and have to face the prejudices of a conservative society.

Cast

 Cláudio Heinrich as Marcus 
 Pedro Andrade as Renato 
 Patricia Araujo as Beatriz
 Priscila Machado as Ana 
 Fernando Sippel as Giorgio 
 Gustavo Gianetti as Carlos
 Marlon Teixeira as Júlio
 Ariela Valenssa as Inês
 Valéria Massotti as Lúcia

Music
The score for O Terceiro Travesseiro was composed by Juliano Silva, with the rest of the soundtrack chosen by music supervisor Sandra Roccove.

Production
The project was in development for approximately three years, during which time a screen adaptation that differed significantly from the novel was written. De La Jara acquired the rights to the novel after three years of the project's stagnant development.

External links
 De La Jara website 
 Deliberation of the film in National Film
 Project in JusBrasil

2012 romantic drama films
2012 films
2010s Portuguese-language films
Films based on Brazilian novels
Films set in Brazil
Brazilian LGBT-related films
Films shot in Brazil
2010s teen romance films
Erotic romance films
LGBT-related films based on actual events
LGBT-related drama films
2012 LGBT-related films
2010s erotic drama films